The Burlington–Harmony Hill Roads Historic District encompasses a historic rural agricultural crossroads village in eastern Harwinton, Connecticut.  Stretching mainly along Harmony Hill Road north of its junction with Burlington Road, it includes residential buildings dating from the mid-18th to late 19th centuries.  The district was listed on the National Register of Historic Places in 1996.

Description and history
The town of Harwinton was established in 1737 from land formerly part of Hartford and Windsor.  Burlington Road, now Connecticut Route 4, was then as now the main road between Farmington and Litchfield.  The junction with Harmony Hill Road and Locust Road, east of the village center, formed as a small community center known as Catlin's Corners, named for Abraham Catlin, the first settler to the area who also operated a small shop.  Instead of dispersed farmsteads, the area grew with houses stretched along Harmony Hill Road north of the junction, with six houses built before the turn of the 19th century, and a school was added at the northeast corner of the junction in the late 18th century.

The historic district is linear, extending from a farmstead on the east side of Locust Street a short way south of the main intersection to a group of three 18th-century houses on the west side of Harmony Hill Road north of the junction. Houses are typically 2-1/2 stories in height, and of wood frame construction. The oldest is that of Jonathan Brace, built about 1730; other houses included two that have been converted from 19th-century barns, and one that was adapted from the 18th-century school building in the 19th century. Two 18th-century houses built by Abraham Catlin's son Abijah define the main intersection.

See also
National Register of Historic Places listings in Litchfield County, Connecticut

References

Historic districts on the National Register of Historic Places in Connecticut
National Register of Historic Places in Litchfield County, Connecticut
Georgian architecture in Connecticut
Queen Anne architecture in Connecticut
Colonial Revival architecture in Connecticut
Geography of Litchfield County, Connecticut
Harwinton, Connecticut